.de is the country code top-level domain (ccTLD) for the Federal Republic of Germany. DENIC (the Network Information Centre responsible for .de domains) does not require specific second-level domains, and there are no official ccSLDs under .de ccTLD, as it is the case with the .uk domain range which until 2014 required .co.uk domain for example.

The name is based on the first two letters of the German name for Germany (Deutschland). Prior to 1990, East Germany had a separate ISO 3166-1 code (dd), and had never delegated a ccTLD, .dd.

.de is currently the second most popular ccTLD in terms of number of registrations with .cn being the first most popular ccTLD and .uk being third. It is third after .com and .cn among all TLDs.
The first point of registration for .de domains was at the Department of Computer Science of the University of Dortmund. uni-dortmund.de was among the first registered .de-domains.

.de registrations may be directly ordered from DENIC but it is faster and cheaper to do so via a DENIC member (registrar).

Previously, domain names had to be at least three letters long. There were a few two-letter domains registered before the rule was put in place: db.de (Deutsche Bahn), ix.de (the German computing magazine iX), and hq.de. A fourth domain, bb.de (Bilfinger Berger), was later deregistered (and after 2009 registered by another company). As of 23 October 2009, DENIC allowed the registration of single- and two-letter domains as well as number-only domains.

Registrations of internationalized domain names (IDN) are also accepted so that all diacritics of German, many diacritics of other languages and the eszett, ß, may be used.

In many of the Romance languages, e.g., Spanish, French, Romanian and Portuguese, "de" expresses the genitive of a noun (like "of" in English). This is exploited in domain registrations under the German TLD for romance language webhosts that offer customized sites, like elforo.de (theforum.of), encoding the site name into the URL path, such as elforo.de/wikipedia, meaning theforum.of/Wikipedia.

See also
 Internet in Germany
 .dd
 .ag
 .eu –ccTLD for the European Union
Generic geographic domains, connected to Germany
.bayern
.berlin
.hamburg
.nrw
.koeln / .cologne
.ruhr
.saarland

References

External links
 DENIC
 List of DENIC members
 IANA .de whois information
 DNSSEC in the .de Zone

Country code top-level domains
Internet in Germany
Computer-related introductions in 1986
Mass media in Germany
Council of European National Top Level Domain Registries members
1986 establishments in Germany
sv:Toppdomän#D